In the Ruins is a 1984 radio play by the British playwright Nick Dear, in which George III of the United Kingdom looks back on his life in 1817, the year before his death. It premiered on BBC Radio 3 in June 1984 and was adapted for the stage at the Bristol Old Vic in 1990, starring Patrick Malahide and directed by Paul Unwin.

References

1984 plays
English plays
Cultural depictions of George III
Plays about British royalty
Plays based on real people
Plays set in the 18th century
British radio dramas